Hiram Rhodes (11 December 1850 – 1 January 1891) was a New Zealand cricketer. He played three first-class matches for Otago between 1872 and 1877.

At a time when long stop was an important fielding position, Rhodes was considered perhaps the best long stop in New Zealand in the 1870s. He later returned to England and died of influenza in Huddersfield in 1891, leaving a widow and two children.

See also
 List of Otago representative cricketers

References

External links
 

1850 births
1891 deaths
New Zealand cricketers
Otago cricketers
Cricketers from Huddersfield
English emigrants to New Zealand
Deaths from influenza